Sarah Douglas may refer to:

Sarah Douglas (actress) (born 1952), British actress
Sarah Douglas (sailor) (born 1991), Canadian sailor
Sarah Ann Douglas (born 1944), computer scientist

See also
Sarah Douglass (disambiguation) 
Sara Douglass (1957–2011), Australian writer